Güznüt is a village and municipality in the Babek District of the Nakhchivan Autonomous Republic in Azerbaijan. The village is located on a plain  from the city of Nakhchivan, on the left side of the Nakhchivan-Julfa highway. The local economy is mainly based on grain-growing and animal husbandry. There is a secondary school, club, mosque and a medical center in the village. It has a population of 1,563. The village had an Armenian majority prior to the Muslim uprisings in Kars and Sharur–Nakhichevan.

Name
In the Nakhchivan dialect of Armenian, Kznut means "plum place". The village was named because of the autumn sowing which is carried out in this area.

Culture
There were several ancient churches in the village, an Armenian cemetery with medieval khachkars, but after the Armenian-Azerbaijani war in 1918-1920, the village lost its Armenian population, and these monuments were subsequently destroyed. A mosque was built in the village in 1986-1992.

Notable natives

 Garegin Nzhdeh - (1886–1955) Armenian commander and national hero.

References 

Populated places in Babek District